Eastwood is a neighborhood of Louisville, Kentucky centered along Shelbyville Road (US 60) and Johnson Road.  The ZIP Code for Eastwood is 40018.

References

External links
History of Eastwood

Neighborhoods in Louisville, Kentucky